NBAF can refer to:
 National Bio and Agro-Defense Facility
 National Black Arts Festival
 2-aminomuconate deaminase, an enzyme